Myrmetes is a genus of beetles belonging to the family Histeridae.

The species of this genus are found in Europe.

Species:
 Myrmetes paykulli Kanaar, 1979

References

Histeridae